Josias Thomas Joesler was a Swiss-American Tucson, Arizona architect.

Life and work
Joesler was born in 1895 in Zurich, Switzerland. His architectural legacy would come to articulate the romantic revival Tucson style of the first half of the 20th century. Educated in Germany and France, he lived in Spain before moving on the new New World, living and working in Havana, Cuba, Mexico City and Los Angeles, California. Joesler married his wife Natividad and the two moved to Tucson in 1927.

His major surviving commercial architectural buildings are spread throughout the historic Tucson core.  Extant buildings are clustered along the Fourth Avenue shopping district and the Broadway Village Shopping center on the corner of Country Club and Broadway.  Other major commercial buildings include the Saint Philips Church and Plaza at Campbell and River Road, St. Michael and All Angels Episcopal Church at 5th and Wilmot and The Ghost Ranch Lodge on Miracle Mile.

Many of his residential buildings are in the Catalina Foothills Estates and in the Historic Blennman–Elm Neighborhood, listed in the National Register of Historic Places. His buildings utilized traditional southwestern hand crafted decorative motifs including: hand applied plaster, hand hewn beams, colored concrete floors and decorative iron/tin work.

Joesler died in Tucson on 12 February 1956. Natividad Joesler died in Spain June 23, 1963.

Note: According to historian David Leighton, of the Arizona Daily Star newspaper, Joesler Village on North Campbell Avenue and East River Road, in Tucson, Arizona, is named in his honor and there is a small street in the Sam Hughes Neighborhood that bears his name.

Extant buildings
All buildings located in Tucson unless otherwise noted.
 Arizona History Museum (1954) (Arizona Historical Society headquarters, Joesler's last project) – 949 E. Second St. at Park Ave.
 Broadway Village Shopping Center (1939) – Southwest corner of Broadway Blvd. and Country Club Road.
 Don Martin Apartments – 605 East 9th Street.
 Haynes Building (1928) – 310 East 6th Street
 Fourth Avenue Shops (1928) – 616 North 4th Avenue
 Ghost Ranch Lodge – 801 West Miracle Mile
 Sigma Alpha Epsilon Fraternity House (1949) – 1509 East 2nd Street
 Seventh-Day Adventist Chapel (1942) – 1200 North Mountain Avenue
 Tucson Unified School District Educational Building Expansion (1948) – 1010 East 10th Street
 St. Philip's in the Hills Episcopal Church (1936) – Northeast corner of River Road and Campbell Avenue
 Murphey-Keith Office Building & Catalina Foothills Estate Estate Sales Office/Joesler Studio  (1937) – River Road and Campbell Avenue
 Hutton Webster Studio and Residence (1939) – River Road and Campbell Avenue
 Murphey-Keith Building Company Office (1940) – River Road and Campbell Avenue.
 El Merendero Tea Room & Gift Shop (1937) – River Road and Campbell Avenue.
 St. Philip's Park (1936) – River Road and Campbell Avenue.
 Catalina Foothills School (1931) Built by the New Deal Works Projects Administration (WPA) – River Road east of Campbell Avenue.
 Catalina Foothills Estates – North of River Road between Campbell Avenue and Hacienda del Sol
 Downtown Motor Hotel (1941) – 383 S Stone Ave
 Americana Apartments (1941) – 151 S. Eastbourne
 Grace Mansion (Eleven Arches) (1937) – Catalina Foothills Estates
 Hacienda Del Sol reconstruction (late 1930s) – Hacienda Del Sol
 Joesler/Loerpabel Residence (1936)
 Johnson Residence (1936)
 St. Michael and All Angels Episcopal Church (1953) – 602 North Wilmot Road
 Our Saviour's Lutheran Church (1948) Campbell and Helen (Joesler was the local architect overseeing the project, and while he did make adjustments to the plan, such as a "re-siting" on the property and some decorative elements, he was not the original designer.  A plan was chosen from a library of plans held by the Lutheran church.  The congregation chose a plan, and Joesler oversaw the building.  In the hallway of the offices there is a water color that Joesler painted that has his signature with "project architect" beneath his name.  This church has mistakenly been attributed to Joesler, but articles in the ADS give the correct information.)

Demolished buildings
 Old World Addition (1927–1928) – Mabel Street, Campbell Avenue, Elm Street and Martin Avenue. Demolished (1970s)

References

 Jeffery, R. Brooks. "Joesler & Murphey: An Architectural Legacy for Tucson". (1994). http://parentseyes.arizona.edu/josiasjoesler/index.html
 Tucson Home Magazine. "A Joesler Retrospective Two Parts": https://web.archive.org/web/20081005042809/http://www.tucsonhomemagazine.com/features/joesler.html
 AZ Daily Star: https://web.archive.org/web/20060326175923/http://regulus.azstarnet.com/azcommunityprofiles/index.php?comm=catfoo&subsection=realestate
 Gellner, Arrol. Red Tile Style: America's Spanish Revival Architecture. Penguin Group, 2002.
 Wangner, The Arts and Decoration Book of Successful Houses, Robert M. McBride & Co. 1940.
 Tibbets, Joe. Adobe News, Issue #10, 1976.
 Regan, Margaret, "Joesler Jostle", Tucson Weekly March 15, 2001: http://www.tucsonweekly.com/gbase/arts/Content?oid=oid:43791
 Tucson Daily Citizen, "Foothills Architects Appointed", June 12, 1957 p. 6
 Brown, Mary. Tucson Daily Citizen, "Mountain Vista Surrounds Home of Arthur Presents". January 19, 1963.
 Brown, Mary. Tucson Daily Citizen, Ambitions Realized. December 18, 1965. p. 50.
 McNeil, Barbara. Tucson Daily Citizen, "TFAA Tour of Homes Highlights Local Architecture and Interiors". March 7, 1959. p. 50.
 Smith, Barbara. Tucson Daily Citizen, "The Dentons Chose a Perfect House for Their Indian Art".    October 29, 1960.
 Smith, Barbara. Tucson Daily Citizen, "An Old House Comes to Live Again". February 3, 1962. p. 50.
 Tucson Daily Citizen, "Mrs. Joesler Dies; Former Tucsonian".  July 2, 1963 p. 23.
 National Register of Historic Places. "Architects in the El Montevideo Neighborhood".
 Leighton, David. Arizona Daily Star, "Street Smarts: Tiny street honors famous Tucson architect". September 16, 2014

External links
 St. Phillips Church: http://www.stphilipstucson.org
 Episcopal Parish of St. Michael And All Angels : http://smallangelstucson.org/about-us/parish-history/
 Ghost Ranch Lodge: http://www.ghostranchlodge.com
 David Leighton, "Street Smarts: Tiny street honors famous Tucson architect," Arizona Daily Star, Sept. 16, 2014

1895 births
20th-century American architects
Swiss emigrants to the United States
1956 deaths
Architects from Tucson, Arizona
People from Zürich
Academy of Fine Arts, Munich alumni